Martín Reyna Osorio (born 5 December 1961) is a Mexican football manager and former player.

References

External links

1961 births
Living people
Association football midfielders
Club Universidad Nacional footballers
C.F. Oaxtepec footballers
Club León footballers
Tampico Madero F.C. footballers
Footballers from the State of Mexico
Mexican footballers